Viktor Andrejev (born 21 November 1948 in Valga) is an Estonian politician. He was a member of VIII Riigikogu.

References

Living people
1948 births
Members of the Riigikogu, 1995–1999
Members of the Riigikogu, 1999–2003
Tallinn University of Technology alumni
Estonian people of Russian descent
People from Valga, Estonia